The Coldstream Guards is the oldest continuously serving regular regiment in the British Army. As part of the Household Division, one of its principal roles is the protection of the monarchy; due to this, it often participates in state ceremonial occasions. The Regiment has consistently provided formations on deployments around the world and has fought in the majority of the major conflicts in which the British Army has been engaged.

The Regiment has been in continuous service and has never been amalgamated. It was formed in 1650 as 'Monck's Regiment of Foot' and was then renamed 'The Lord General's Regiment of Foot Guards' after the restoration in 1660. With Monck's death in 1670 it was again renamed 'The Coldstream Regiment of Foot Guards' after the location in Scotland from which it marched to help restore the monarchy in 1660. Its name was again changed to 'The Coldstream Guards' in 1855 and this is still its present title.

Today, the Regiment consists of: Regimental Headquarters, a single battalion (the 1st Battalion), an independent incremental company (Number 7 Company, maintaining the customs and traditions, as well as carrying the Colours of 2nd Battalion), a Regimental Band, a reserve company (Number 17 Company) and individuals at training establishments and other extra regimental employment.

History

English Civil War
The origin of The Coldstream Guards lies in the English Civil War when Oliver Cromwell gave Colonel George Monck permission to form his own regiment as part of the New Model Army. Monck took men from the regiments of George Fenwick and Sir Arthur Haselrig, five companies each, and on 13 August 1650 formed Monck's Regiment of Foot. Less than two weeks later, this force took part in the Battle of Dunbar, at which the Roundheads defeated the forces of Charles Stuart.

After Richard Cromwell's abdication, Monck gave his support to the Stuarts, and on 1 January 1660 he crossed the River Tweed into England at the village of Coldstream, from where he made a five-week march to London. He arrived in London on 2 February and helped in the Restoration of the monarchy. For his help, Monck was given the Order of the Garter and his regiment was assigned to keep order in London. However, the new parliament soon ordered his regiment to be disbanded along with all of the other regiments of the New Model Army.

Before that could happen, Parliament was forced to rely on the help of the regiment against the rebellion by the Fifth Monarchists led by Thomas Venner on 6 January 1661. The regiment defeated the rebels and on 14 February the men of the regiment symbolically laid down their arms as part of the New Model Army and were immediately ordered to take them up again as a royal regiment of The Lord General's Regiment of Foot Guards, a part of the Household Troops.

The regiment was placed as the second senior regiment of Household Troops, as it entered the service of the Crown after the 1st Regiment of Foot Guards, but it answered to that by adopting the motto Nulli Secundus (Second to None) as the regiment is older than the senior regiment. The regiment always stands on the left of the line when on parade with the rest of the Foot Guards, so standing "second to none". When Monck died in 1670, the Earl of Craven took command of the regiment and it adopted a new name, the Coldstream Regiment of Foot Guards.

Overseas service (1685–1900)
The regiment saw active service in Flanders and in the Monmouth Rebellion, including the decisive Battle of Sedgemoor in 1685. It fought in the Battle of Walcourt in 1689, the Battle of Landen and the Siege of Namur.

In 1760, the 2nd Battalion was sent to Germany to campaign under Prince Ferdinand of Brunswick and fought in the Battle of Wilhelmstal and at the Castle of Amöneburg. Three Guards companies of 307 men under Coldstream commander Colonel Edward Mathew fought in the American Revolutionary War.

The Coldstream Regiment saw extensive service in the wars against the French Revolution and in the Napoleonic Wars. Under the command of Sir Ralph Abercromby, it defeated French troops in Egypt. In 1807, it took part in the investment of Copenhagen. In January 1809, it sailed to Portugal to join the forces under Sir Arthur Wellesley. In 1814, it took part in the Battle of Bayonne, in France, where a cemetery keeps their memory. The 2nd Battalion joined the Walcheren Expedition. Later, it served as part of the 2nd Guards Brigade in the Chateau Hougoumont where they resisted French assaults all day during the Battle of Waterloo. This defence is considered one of the greatest achievements of the regiment, and an annual ceremony of "Hanging the Brick" is performed each year in the Sergeants' Mess to commemorate the efforts of Cpl James Graham and Lt-Col James Macdonnell, who shut the North Gate after a French attack. The Duke of Wellington himself declared after the battle that "the success of the battle turned upon closing the gates at Hougoumont".

The regiment was later part of the British occupation forces of Paris until 1816.

During the Crimean War, the Coldstream Regiment fought in the battles of Alma, Inkerman and Sevastopol. On its return, four men of the regiment were awarded the newly instituted Victoria Cross.

The regiment received its current name, The Coldstream Guards, in 1855. In 1882, it was sent to Egypt against the rebels of Ahmed 'Urabi and in 1885 in the Suakin Campaign. In 1897, the Coldstreamers were reinforced with the addition of a 3rd battalion. The 1st and 2nd battalions were dispatched to South Africa at the outbreak of the Second Boer War.

1900–present

At the outbreak of the First World War, the Coldstream Guards was among the first British regiments to arrive in France after Britain declared war on Germany. In the following battles, it suffered heavy losses, in two cases losing all of its officers. At the First Battle of Ypres, the 1st battalion was virtually annihilated: by 1 November down to 150 men and the Lt Quartermaster. The regiment fought at Mons, Loos, the Somme, Ginchy and in the 3rd Battle of Ypres. The regiment also formed the 4th (Pioneer) Battalion, which was disbanded after the war, in 1919. The 5th Reserve battalion never left Britain before it was disbanded.

When the Second World War began, the 1st and 2nd battalions of The Coldstream Guards were part of the British Expeditionary Force (BEF) in France; whilst the 3rd Battalion was on overseas service in the Middle East. Additional 4th and 5th battalions were also formed for the duration of the war. They fought extensively, as part of the Guards Armoured Division, in North Africa and Europe as dismounted infantry. The 4th battalion first became a motorized battalion in 1940 and then an armoured battalion in 1943.

Coldstreamers gave up their tanks at the end of the war, the new battalions were disbanded, and the troops distributed to the 1st and 2nd Guard Training Battalions.

After the war, the 1st and 3rd battalions served in Palestine. The 2nd battalion served in the Malayan Emergency. The 3rd battalion was placed in suspended animation in 1959. The remaining battalions served during the Mau Mau rebellion from 1959 to 1962, in Aden in 1964, in Mauritius in 1965, in the Turkish invasion of Cyprus in 1974 and several times in Northern Ireland after 1969.

The Regimental Band of The Coldstream Guards was the first act on stage at the Wembley leg of the 1985 Live Aid charity concert. It played for the Prince and Princess of Wales.

In 1991, the 1st battalion was dispatched to the first Gulf War, where it was involved in prisoner of war handling and other roles. In 1993, due to defence cutbacks, the 2nd battalion was placed in suspended animation.

For much of the 1990s, the 1st Battalion was stationed in Münster, Germany, in the Armoured Infantry Role with Warrior APCs as part of the 4th Armoured Brigade. In 1993–1994, the battalion served as an armoured infantry battalion in peacekeeping duties in Bosnia as part of UNPROFOR.

The battalion was posted to Derry, Northern Ireland, on a two-year deployment in 2001. It then deployed to Iraq in April 2005 for a six-month tour with the rest of 12th Mechanised Brigade, based in the south of the country. The battalion lost two of its soldiers, on 2 May, near Al Amarah and on 18 October at Basra.

Des Browne, Secretary of State for Defence, announced on 19 July 2007 that in October 2007 the battalion was to be sent to Afghanistan as part of 52 Infantry Brigade. In March 2008, while on patrol with the ANA, members of the Regiment discovered a Taliban torture chamber.

In October 2009, the battalion was deployed on Operation Herrick 11, with units deploying to the Babaji area of central Helmand Province, Afghanistan, playing a major role in Operation Moshtarak in February 2010.

Before the Strategic Defence and Security Review 2010 the battalion was part of the 12th Mechanised Brigade in a light infantry role. Under Army 2020 it transferred to London District as a public duties battalion, then in 2019 it joined the 11th Infantry Brigade and Headquarters South East.  It will move to 4 Light Brigade Combat Team by 2025.

Structure
The structure of the regiment and affiliated band includes:

 Regimental Headquarters, at Wellington Barracks, London
 1st Battalion, at Victoria Barracks, Windsor (Light Infantry part of 11th Infantry Brigade and Headquarters South East)
 Battalion Headquarters
 Headquarters Company
 No.1 Company (Senior Company)
 No.2 Company
 No.3 Company
 Support (No.4) Company (includes regimental corps of drums)
 No.7 Company, based at Wellington Barracks, London (maintaining the traditions and colours of the old 2nd Battalion placed in suspended animation in 1993)
 No 17 Company, based at Hammersmith (the regiment's reserve unit, administered as part of 1st Battalion, London Guards).
 Band of the Coldstream Guards, based at Wellington Barracks, London, part of the Royal Corps of Army Music.

Companies that make up the regiment are traditionally numbered. New officers destined for the regiment that are at Sandhurst or at the Infantry Battle School form No. 13 Coy, while Guardsmen under training at ITC Catterick make up No. 14 Coy. No. 7 Coy is one of the incremental companies formed to undertake public duties in London and Windsor, and maintains the colours and traditions of the former 2nd Battalion.

Role

Currently, the most prominent role of the 1st Battalion and No. 7 Company is the performance of ceremonial duties in London and Windsor as part of the Household Division. Operationally, The Coldstream Guards currently perform the role of light infantry. The 1st Battalion is based in Windsor at Victoria Barracks as an operational light infantry battalion.

In 2027 1st Battalion will take over a security force assistance role from 1st Battalion the Irish Guards.

The Corps of Drums, in addition to their ceremonial role, which has been primarily the musical accompaniment of Changing of the Guard for Windsor Castle, has the role of machine gun platoon. All Guardsmen for public duties wear the 'Home Service' Dress tunic in summer or greatcoat in winter and bearskin with a red plume. The Coldstream Guards regimental band plays at Changing of The Guard, state visits and many other events.

Unlike the other four regiments of foot guards, which recruit from each of the four home nations, the Coldstream Guards has a specific recruiting area, which encompasses the counties that Monck's Regiment passed through on its march from Coldstream to London. The traditional recruiting area of the Coldstream Guards is the South West and North East of England.

The Coldstream Guards and other Guards Regiments have a long-standing connection to The Parachute Regiment. Guardsmen who have completed P company have the option of being posted to the Guards Parachute Platoon, 3 PARA, still keeping the tradition of the No 1 (Guards) Independent Parachute Company, which was the original Pathfinder Group of 16th Parachute Brigade, now renamed 16th Air Assault Brigade.

Traditions

The grouping of buttons on the tunic is a common way to distinguish between the regiments of Foot Guards. Coldstream buttons are arranged in pairs, and a Star of the Garter is marked on their brassware.

The regiment is ranked second in the order of precedence, behind The Grenadier Guards. The regiment have the motto Nulli Secundus (Second to None), which is a play on the fact that the regiment was originally the "Second Regiment of Foot Guards", a position they have never accepted as the regiment is older than the Grenadier Guards.

The regiment's nickname is Lilywhites. An ordinary soldier of the regiment is called a Guardsman, a designation granted by King George V after the First World War. The regiment is always referred to as the Coldstream, never as the Coldstreams; likewise, a member of the regiment is referred to as a Coldstreamer.

Training
Recruits to the Guards Division go through an intensive training programme at the British Army's Infantry Training Centre (ITC). Their training is two weeks longer than the programme provided for recruits to the Regular line infantry regiments of the British Army; the extra training, carried out throughout the course, is devoted to drill and ceremonies.

Colonels-in-Chief
King Edward VII assumed the colonelcy-in-chief of the regiment on his accession, and subsequent monarchs have also been colonel-in-chief.

Regimental Colonels
George Monck's Regiment (1650)

Lord General's Regiment of Foot Guards (1661)
 Captain-General George Monck, 1st Duke of Albemarle, 1650–1678

Coldstream Regiment of Foot Guards (1670)
 Lieutenant General William Craven, 1st Earl of Craven, 1678–1689
 Lieutenant General Thomas Talmash (or Tollemache), 1689–1694
 Lieutenant General John Cutts, 1st Baron Cutts, 1694–1702
 General Charles Churchill, 1702–1714
 Lieutenant General William Cadogan, 1st Earl of Cadogan, 1714–1722
 Colonel Richard Lumley, 2nd Earl of Scarbrough, 1722–1740
 Field Marshal Prince William, Duke of Cumberland, 1740–1742
 Colonel Charles Spencer, 3rd Duke of Marlborough, 1742–1744
 Lieutenant General Willem Anne van Keppel, 2nd Earl of Albemarle, 1744–1755
 Lieutenant General James O'Hara, 2nd Baron Tyrawley, 1755–1773
 General John Waldegrave, 3rd Earl of Waldegrave, 1773–1784
 Field Marshal Prince Frederick, Duke of York and Albany, 1784–1805
 Field Marshal Prince Adolphus, Duke of Cambridge, 1805–1850
 Field Marshal John Byng, 1st Earl of Strafford, 1850–1860
 Coldstream Guards (1855)
 Field Marshal Colin (Macliver) Campbell, 1st Baron Clyde, 1860–1863
 Field Marshal Sir William Maynard Gomm, 1863–1875
 General Sir William Codrington, 1875–1884
 General Sir Thomas Montagu Steele, 1884–1890
 General Sir Arthur Edward Hardinge, 1890–1892
 General Sir Frederick Stephenson, 1892–1911
 General Lord William Frederick Ernest Seymour, 1911–1915
 Major General Evelyn Edward Thomas Boscawen, 7th Viscount Falmouth, 1915–1918
 Lieutenant General Sir Alfred Edward Codrington, 1918–1945
 General Sir Charles Loyd, 1945–1962
 Major General Sir Walter Arthur George Burns, 1962–1994
 Lieutenant General The Hon Sir William Edward Rous, 1994–1999
 General Sir Hugh Michael Rose, 1999–2009
 Lieutenant General Sir James Jeffrey Corfield Bucknall, 2009–present

Regimental Lieutenant Colonels

The Regimental Lieutenant Colonels have included:

Battle honours
The Coldstream Guards have earned 117 battle honours:

 Tangier 1680, Namur 1695, Gibraltar 1704–1705, Oudenarde, Malplaquet, Dettingen, Lincelles, Egypt, Talavera, Barrosa, Fuentes d'Onor, Salamanca, Nive, Peninsula, Waterloo, Alma, Inkerman, Sevastopol, Tel-el-Kebir, Egypt 1882, Suakin 1885, Modder River, South Africa 1899–1902
 The Great War (5 battalions): Mons, Retreat from Mons, Marne 1914, Aisne 1914, Ypres 1914 '17, Langemarck 1914, Gheluvelt, Nonne Bosschen, Givenchy 1914, Neuve Chapelle, Aubers, Festubert 1915, Loos, Mount Sorrel, Somme 1916 '18, Flers-Courcelette, Morval, Pilckem, Menin Road, Poelcappelle, Passchendaele, Cambrai 1917 '18, St. Quentin, Bapaume 1918, Arras 1918, Lys, Hazebrouck, Albert 1918, Scarpe 1918, Drocourt-Quéant, Hindenburg Line, Havrincourt, Canal du Nord, Selle, Sambre, France and Flanders 1914–1918
 The Second World War: Dyle, Defence of Escaut, Dunkirk 1940, Cagny, Mont Pincon, Quarry Hill, Estry, Heppen, Nederrijn, Venraij, Meijel, Roer, Rhineland, Reichswald, Cleve, Goch, Moyland, Hochwald, Rhine, Lingen, Uelzen, North-West Europe 1940 '44–45, Egyptian Frontier 1940, Sidi Barrani, Halfaya 1941, Tobruk 1941–42, Msus, Knightsbridge, Defence of Alamein Line, Medenine, Mareth, Longstop Hill 1942, Sbiba, Steamroller Farm, Tunis, Hammam Lif, North Africa 1940–1943, Salerno, Battipaglia, Capezzano, Volturno Crossing, Monte Camino, Calabritto, Garigliano Crossing, Monte Ornito, Monte Piccolo, Capture of Perugia, Arezzo, Advance to Florence, Monte Domini, Catarelto Ridge, Argenta Gap, Italy 1943–1945
 Gulf 1991

Order of precedence

Alliances
  – The Governor General's Foot Guards
  – 2nd Battalion, Royal Australian Regiment
  – HMS Ocean

Gallery

See also
 :Category:Coldstream Guards officers
 :Category:Coldstream Guards soldiers
 Eddie Chapman criminal and World War II British double agent served with the Coldstream Guards.
 Honourable Artillery Company, the oldest surviving regiment in the British Army
 Band of the Coldstream Guards

Notes

Citations

References
 Sir Julian Paget, Bt – Second to none : the Coldstream Guards, 1650–2000 (2000) 
 
 Roberts, Andrew; Waterloo: Napoleon's Last Gamble, 2005, London: HarperCollins Publishers,

Further reading
  See the end of page 657 and the start of 658.

External links

 
 Coldstream Guards (Official Charity Website)
 The Guards Museum Containing the history of the five regiments of Foot Guards, Wellington Barracks, London.
 Coldstream Guards Band site
 The Queen's Footguards
 Shiny Capstar (unofficial site)
 Canadian Coldstream Guards
 Coldstream Guards Corps Of Drums
 
 
 The Coldstream Guards Association Windsor Branch No.18
 British Army Locations from 1945 British Army Locations from 1945
 Origin and services of the Coldstream guards by Colonel Daniel Mackinnon

 
1650 establishments in England
British ceremonial units
Guards regiments
Infantry regiments of the British Army
Military units and formations established in 1650
Military units and formations of the Iraq War
Military units and formations of the Second Boer War
Military units and formations of the United Kingdom in the Peninsular War
Military units and formations of the United Kingdom in the War in Afghanistan (2001–2021)
Regiments of the British Army in the Crimean War
Regiments of the British Army in World War I
Regiments of the British Army in World War II